Abdoellah Steenkamp (born 24 October 1974) is a South African cricket umpire. He has stood in matches in the Sunfoil 3-Day Cup tournament. He is part of Cricket South Africa's umpire panel for first-class matches.

References

External links
 

1974 births
Living people
South African cricket umpires
Sportspeople from Cape Town